Hector Pizorno (born May 10, 1934) was an Argentine former footballer.

Career 
Pizorno played in the Argentine Primera División in 1953 with Newell's Old Boys. In 1961, he played abroad in the National Soccer League with the Polish White Eagles. During his tenure with Toronto he featured in the Dominion Cup tournament against Toronto Roma. He was loaned for a match to the Hamilton Steelers in the Eastern Canada Professional Soccer League. The remainder of the season he played with Toronto Roma.

Personal life 
His twin brother Angelo was also a footballer.

References 

1934 births
Argentine footballers
Newell's Old Boys footballers
Hamilton Steelers (ECPSL) players
Toronto Roma players
Argentine Primera División players
Canadian National Soccer League players
Eastern Canada Professional Soccer League players
Footballers from Rosario, Santa Fe
Association football forwards
Living people